Rear Admiral Ewa Ann-Sofi Skoog Haslum née Skoog (born 26 March 1968) is a Swedish Navy officer. She currently serves as Chief of Navy.

Early life
Skoog was born on 26 March 1968 in Hov Parish, Kristianstad County, Sweden, and she grew up in Torekov. She attended the technical program in secondary school. Skoog Haslum began her military career in 1987 as a conscript enlisted radio telegraphist on board HSwMS Stockholm.

Career
She was commissioned as a naval officer in the 2nd Surface Warfare Flotilla (Andra ytstridsflottiljen) in 1990 with the rank of acting sub-lieutenant (fänrik). She was promoted to lieutenant there in 1993. From 1994 to 1995, she served as an artillery officer/observer on HSwMS Gävle (K22). At this time, she also served as a steering officer and "kept watch together with Anders Olovsson, her future Deputy Chief of Navy. Skoog Haslum was promoted to lieutenant in 1995. From 1997 to 1998, she served as a teacher at the Tactical Command School (Ledningsstridsskolan) at Berga Naval Base.

Skoog Haslum's first position outside the navy was from 2001 to 2003 when she served in the Future Planning Department (Perspektivplaneringen, PerP) at the Swedish Armed Forces Headquarters in Stockholm. She served as captain of the corvette  from 2006 to 2008. For almost 6 months in 2007, she captained HSwMS Sundsvall in the UNIFIL Maritime Task Force (MTF) and patrolled the coast of Lebanon, to stop gun smugglers and terrorists, and to ensure aid deliveries reach Beirut, and not be cut off by pirates. From 2008 to 2010, she attended the Management Program of the Swedish National Defence College and from 2010 to 2011 she was assigned to the Maritime Component Command at the Swedish Armed Forces Headquarters. From 2010 to 2017, Skoog Haslum served one month a year as Aide-de-camp to Victoria, Crown Princess of Sweden.

She was commanding officer of the 4th Naval Warfare Flotilla from 2014 to 2016 and she was then employed by the Swedish Defence University from 1 December 2016 and became the new Deputy Vice Chancellor of the university in early 2017. She then came together with the Vice Chancellor to lead the Swedish Defence University's development of education, not least with regard to future officer training. The Deputy Vice Chancellor is the Swedish Defence University's highest military representative and advises the Vice Chancellor. The Deputy Vice Chancellor has an important role in the development of the university and is also responsible for collaboration with foreign defense colleges and other international partners in the military field. The Deputy Vice Chancellor also acts as exercise leader in major exercises. In conjunction with the appointment, Skoog Haslum was promoted to rear admiral (lower half).

On 11 December 2019, Skoog Haslum was appointed Chief of Navy and she took office on 21 January 2020. She was at the same time promoted to rear admiral.

Personal life
Skoog is married to Stefan Haslum and they two sons.

Dates of rank
1990 – Acting sub-lieutenant
1993 – Sub-lieutenant
1995 – Lieutenant
2001 – Lieutenant commander
2010 – Commander
2014 – Captain
2016 – Rear admiral (lower half)
2020 – Rear admiral

Awards and decorations

Swedish
   For Zealous and Devoted Service of the Realm
   King Carl XVI Gustaf's Jubilee Commemorative Medal II (23 August 2013)
   H. M. The King's Medal, 8th size gold (silver-gilt) medal worn on the chest suspended by the Order of the Seraphim ribbon (28 January 2015)
   Crown Princess Victoria and Prince Daniel's Wedding Commemorative Medal (8 June 2010)
   Swedish Armed Forces Conscript Medal
   Swedish Armed Forces International Service Medal
   2nd Surface Warfare Flotilla Commemorative Medal (2. ytstridsflottiljens minnesmedalj, 2ysfljMSM)

Foreign

   Commander of the Ordre national du Mérite (1 September 2022)
    United Nations Medal (UNIFIL)

Honours
Member of the Royal Swedish Academy of War Sciences (2018)

References

1968 births
Living people
People from Båstad Municipality
Swedish Navy rear admirals
Members of the Royal Swedish Academy of War Sciences
Female admirals
Female generals and flag officers of Sweden